7 Days 6 Nights is a 2022 Indian Telugu-language coming-of-age romantic comedy film written and directed by M. S. Raju. The film features Sumanth Ashwin, Meher Chahal, Rohan M and Kritika Shetty in primary roles. 7 Days 6 Nights was released on 24 June 2022.

Plot

Cast 

 Sumanth Ashwin as Anand
 Meher Chahal as Rathika
 Rohan M as Mangalam
 Kritika Shetty as Ameya
 Rishika Bali as Vinni
 Sushma
 Goparaju Ramana
 Junaid Siddique
 Murali Krishna
 Pramila
 Imran
 Charan
 Krishna Teja
 Pratyusha
 Vijay Kumar

Production 
The film was officially announced in May 2021 coinciding with the birthday of M. S. Raju. Speaking to 10TV, Sumanth said that the filming will begin in June 2021. The film was shot extensively in Udupi and Mangalore of Karnataka and Goa. In an interview with Sakshi, Raju revealed that 1949 Hindi film Barsaat was an inspiration for this film. Sumanth Ashwin's character is designed on the basis of Raj Kapoor's role in Barsaat.

Soundtrack 
The film's soundtrack and score is composed by Samarth Gollapudi.

Release 
After RRR postponed its release date, several films including 7 Days 6 Nights was planned to release on 14 January 2022. The film was then postponed and theatrically released on 24 June 2022.

Reception 
The Times of India gave a rating of 3 out of 5 and stated that "The movie's first half breezes effortlessly - the hangover humour, fantastic visuals, a bit of father-son bond, and the car journey to Goa keep the viewers entertained. However, while still engaging in parts, the second half suffers a slight drag and monotony in the characters' mannerisms". 123Telugu gave a final verdict stating: "7 Days 6 Nights is a youthful drama that has passable comedy and emotions. But the story, narration, and proceedings are ordinary and do not give that kick that is expected from such comedy capers, and end the film as a below-average watch". NTV in their review opined that dialogues and duration are film's plus points, whereas slow-pace narration, story and screenplay are film's negative factors.

References

External links 

 

2022 films
2020s Telugu-language films
Indian coming-of-age films
Indian romantic comedy films
2022 romantic comedy films
Films set in the United States
Films set in Goa
Films directed by M. S. Raju